Golaghmuli Valley or Koh-i-Ghizer or Valley of Martyrs or Shandur Valley is a high mountainous valley in the present day Gupis–Yasin District of Gilgit-Baltistan, Pakistan.

Geography 
This valley is situated to the east of Chitral and north of Swat. Golaghmuli Valley is separated from the Chitral and Swat by high mountain passes. To reach Golaghmuli Valley, a person must take the Gilgit-Chitral road west from Gilgit, and then continue his journey straight by Gupis. After Gupis, one continues northwest to reach the Yasin Valley and the straight road goes to Golaghmuli Valley.

History 
Golaghmuli Valley is a big part of Tehsil Phander, a new Tehsil of Ghizer District (now part of Gupis–Yasin District). It was formerly a part of Tehsil Gupis. In the government of PPP, it was decided to make Golaghmuli, a new Tehsil. But the government of PML (N) gave it the whole power of a Tehsil. Phander  was originally ruled by the Governor of Gupis, Raja Hussain Ali Khan Maqpoon. The Rajas of Gupis were great warriors and fought against the Sikhs and the Dogras, but this house eventually lost power and ownership of Koh-i-Ghizer at the time of FCR.

Golaghmuli Valley is of strategic importance because it leads to a high mountain pass, to Laspur Valley in Chitral via Shandur Top, and then to Mastuj. Another gateway is the passage of Dadaili Pass in Handarap Nallah, which leads to Swat District.

Villages 
Golaghmuli Valley and Phander Valley are located in the west of District Gupis–Yasin. It includes the villages of Rawat, Shamaran, Chashi, Phander, Golaghmuli, Golaghtori, Terich, Handarap, Handarap Nallah including Lake, Herkush, Teru, Karim Abad, Hilthi, Barset and a wide area of Khukush Nallah including Shandur.

Administratively, Tehsil Phander is a newly Tehsil and is under the jurisdiction of GB-LA 30. The Phander Village is the headquarter of the Tehsil Phander. However, Golaghmuli (originally called Gherz) is also a populated village in this Tehsil.

Language 
The people of Golaghmuli Valley speak the Khowar language, which is the native language. However people also know how to speak Shina, Urdu, and English as well.

Religion 
Islam is the only religion followed over here. People belong to Isma'ili and Sunni sects. 65% of total population belong to Ismaili Islam and the rest belong to Sunni Islam.

Climate
The climate of Golaghmuli Valley is considered to be a local steppe climate. During the year, there is a rainfall which takes place during January to the end of March. This climate is considered to be BSK according to the Köppen-Geiger climate classification. The average annual temperature in Golaghmuli Valley is 19.6 °C. About 429 mm of precipitation falls annually.

Tribes 
There is a number of ethnicity living in Golaghmuli Valley. There is a number of tribes living here as under;
 Kakakhel (tribe)
 Chorotay
 Masafay
 Shukhaye
 Shumuray
 Rabakhanay
 Sirangay
 Shamshiray
 Mukhay
 Khonay
 Zhikhonay
 Baloshay
 Doulatshay
 Masholay
 Dubey
 Muthiye

Passes 
Golaghmuli Valley is in a highly mountainous place. It is situated along with the border of Swat and Chitral. The Shandur Pass connects Golaghmuli Valley with Chitral, while the Dadarili (Dadaili) Pass connects Golaghmuli Valley to Swat. Another pass to Swat District is nearby Khukush Langar (Baha) Lake, which is called Naghlacho Dahar. There is another pass, which is "Chumarkhan Ann", which connects Barset to Mestuj Chapali. Along with Chumarkhan Ann, Ghotbar Ann is situated, which connect Barset with Harchin. All these passes are easy for the tourists and hikers to shorten their journey.

Lakes 
Golaghmuli Valley has a number of lakes including;
 Khukush Langar (Baha) Lake 
 Shandur Lake 
 Handarap Lake
 Phander Lake
 Golaghtori Lake 1
 Golaghtori Lake 2
 Shahi Mall Lake
 Barich Lake

References

External links 
 Google Product Forums
  

Gupis-Yasin District
Valleys of Gilgit-Baltistan